is a Japanese film director.

Biography
After graduating in Business at the Waseda University, Nihonmatsu was hired at the Shochiku Ofuna Photographic Office in 1948 and later became assistant director to filmmakers such as Akira Kurosawa, Keisuke Kinoshita and more often to Masaki Kobayashi.

As a director, Nihonmatsu directed only two kaiju films: The X from Outer Space and Genocide, both produced by Shochiku, at its first experiences producing J-Horror films.

Filmography

Assistant director
 Carmen Comes Home (1951, directed by Keisuke Kinoshita)
 The Idiot (1951, directed by Akira Kurosawa)
 Youth of the Son (1952, directed by Masaki Kobayashi)
 Sincere Heart (1953, directed by Masaki Kobayashi)
 The Thick-Walled Room (1956, directed by Masaki Kobayashi)
 The Inheritance (1962, directed by Masaki Kobayashi)

Director
 The X from Outer Space (1967, also screenwriter)
 Genocide (1968)

References

External links
 
 

1922 births
Possibly living people
Horror film directors
Japanese film directors